Vladimir Chuyan (29 September 1940 – 28 December 2002) was a Soviet sports shooter. He competed in two events at the 1964 Summer Olympics.

References

1940 births
2002 deaths
Soviet male sport shooters
Olympic shooters of the Soviet Union
Shooters at the 1964 Summer Olympics
People from Magnitogorsk
Sportspeople from Chelyabinsk Oblast